Ioli Kalavrezou is Dumbarton Oaks Professor of Byzantine Art at Harvard University. Her research focuses on early Christian and Byzantine art.

Career 
Prior to joining Harvard, Kalavrezou taught at UCLA and at Ludwig Maximilian University in Munich.

"Byzantine Women" Exhibition 
In 2002, Kalavrezou curated an exhibit at the Arthur M. Sackler Museum at Harvard called "Byzantine Women and their World," Unlike previous exhibitions focused on the high art of the Byzantine court and church, this exhibit examine the daily lives of "unexceptional" Byzantine women, challenging the notion that their existence was powerless. The culmination of a graduate seminar, the exhibit was broad in both geographic and temporal scope: its 186 objects spanned the full range of the Byzantine empire, from the fourth to the sixteenth centuries and including Italy, North Africa, the Balkans, Asia Minor, and the Holy Land. The accompanying catalogue pictures most of the exhibit’s objects in color and accompanying essay, many written by students.  These and the introductory essays serve a dual purpose, both the traditional function of an art catalogue as well as shedding light on the history of Byzantine women.

Books
 Byzantine women and their world (2003) , 
 Byzantine icons in steatite (1985) 
 Steatite carvings of the middle Byzantine Period (1977)

References

External links

Ioli Kalavrezou - Dumbarton Oaks Oral History
http://web.mit.edu/hellenic/www/symposium/Kalavrezou.pdf

Living people
Women art historians
Harvard University faculty
University of California, Los Angeles faculty
Year of birth missing (living people)
Historians of Byzantine art
Women Byzantinists
Women medievalists